Rolie Polie Guacamole is an American kindie rock band from Brooklyn, New York made up of Frank Gallo and Andrew Tuzhilin. The band has won three Parents' Choice Awards.

References 

American rock music groups
American children's musical groups